Murchison Cirque is a glacier-filled cirque between Kuno Cirque and Arkell Cirque on the south side of the Read Mountains, Shackleton Range. Photographed from the air by the U.S. Navy, 1967, and surveyed by British Antarctic Survey (BAS), 1968–71. In association with the names of geologists grouped in this area, named by the United Kingdom Antarctic Place-Names Committee (UK-APC) in 1971 after Sir Roderick Impey Murchison (1792–1871), British geologist; President, Royal Geographical Society, 1843–44, 1851–52, and 1855–58; Director-General, Geological Survey of Great Britain, 1855–71.

Cirques of Coats Land